Guy Lecluyse (born 29 June 1962) is a French comedian and actor. He appeared in more than forty films since 1988.

Selected filmography
Film

Television

References

External links 

1962 births
Living people
People from Tourcoing
French male film actors